Saint-Félix-de-Tournegat (Languedocien: Sant Felitz de Tornagat) is a commune in the Ariège department in southwestern France.

St-Félix-de-Tournegat is a small rural and very peaceful hilltop village. St Félix de Tournegat which includes the hamlets and farms of Barthès, Bel-Fort, Escapat, La Pujolle, Le Paradis, Les Seigneuries, Marvielle, Montagnac, Rigail, and Villerousse.

The village dates from the Iron Age and was occupied during Roman times. The Roman fortified church, dedicated to St Félix in the 13th Century has been beautifully restored, and is now a Classified Historic Monument.

Population
Inhabitants are called Saint-Félixans.

Sights
Just outside the village is the Domaine de Montagnac, a converted farm and former Equestrian Centre.

See also
Communes of the Ariège department

References

Communes of Ariège (department)
Ariège communes articles needing translation from French Wikipedia